The AD Seaplane Type 1000 also known as the Admiralty Type 1000 and the AD.1 (from Air Department) was a British seaplane of the First World War designed to attack German warships.  When it first flew, it was the largest British aircraft yet to take to the air.

Development
The design of the AD.1 was by Harris Booth of the Admiralty's Air Department just prior to World War I.  It was the world's first aircraft designed from scratch as a torpedo bomber, one of the three planned versions of the design.  The other two were a bomber and an aircraft armed with a recoilless Davis 12-pounder gun (approximately 76 mm calibre).

The aircraft was a float-equipped biplane of pod-and-boom design, with engines mounted at the front of both booms, as well as at the rear of the crew pod. Development began in 1915; it was completed and flown for the first time during the summer of 1916.  It was found that the Davis gun would project a blast rearwards so the weapon was changed for a conventional 12-pounder 'Naval Landing Gun' though in practice a gun was never installed in the AD.1.

Service
Seven aircraft were ordered from J. Samuel White, but when the first one delivered was tested, it was found that its weight was higher than expected, its performance was unexpectedly poor and its undercarriage was not robust enough: based on these findings, the contract for the remaining six aircraft was cancelled. The sole example is known to have survived until 1916, probably at the Royal Naval Air Service's Seaplane Experimental Station, Felixstowe base.

Specifications (AD Seaplane Type 1000)

References
Notes

Bibliography

Goodall, Mike. "Wight Elephants: Murray Sueter's Quest for a Large Military Aircraft". Air Enthusiast, No. 73, January/February 1998. Stamford, Lincs, UK:Key Publishing. . pp. 14–19.
Mason, Francis K. The British Bomber since 1914. London:Putnam, 1994. .

Type 1000
1910s British bomber aircraft
Cancelled military aircraft projects of the United Kingdom
Rotary-engined aircraft
Floatplanes
Three-engined push-pull aircraft
Twin-boom aircraft
Biplanes
Aircraft first flown in 1916